The Third Extraordinary Session of the Islamic Summit Conference was a conference organised by the Organisation of the Islamic Conference in Makkah, Saudi Arabia, on 7 and 8 December 2005.

This was organised in response to the Muhammad cartoon controversy.

The conference dealt with issues regarding the "crisis" in Islam, and outlined a 10-year modernisation program.

References

Official Website

Organisation of Islamic Cooperation
2005 conferences
Islamic conferences